12 Endeavour Square, also known as 1 Westfield Avenue, is a commercial building within the International Quarter London in Stratford, London, occupied by the Financial Conduct Authority and UNICEF.  It was completed in 2018, its developers were Lendlease and LCR, and its architect was Rogers Stirk Harbour + Partners.

References

External links
Google Maps location
12 Endeavour Square

Buildings and structures in the London Borough of Newham
Office buildings in London
Office buildings completed in 2018
Stratford, London